La Vista, also known as The Grove, is a historic plantation house in Spotsylvania County, Virginia, United States. It was built about 1855, and is a two-story, three bay, Federal / Greek revival style frame dwelling.  It has a hipped roof, interior end chimneys, and a pedimented portico with fluted Doric order columns.  Also on the property are the contributing smokehouse and the Boulware family burial grounds.

La Vista was added to the National Register of Historic Places in December 1997.

References

Houses on the National Register of Historic Places in Virginia
Federal architecture in Virginia
Greek Revival houses in Virginia
Houses completed in 1838
Houses in Spotsylvania County, Virginia
National Register of Historic Places in Spotsylvania County, Virginia